The 2010–11 network television schedule for the five major English language commercial broadcast networks in the United States. The schedule covers prime time hours from September 2010 through August 2011. The schedule is followed by a list per network of returning series, new series, and series canceled after the 2009–10 season. As in previous years, the schedule omits the Public Broadcasting Service (whose programming is listed here). 

NBC was the first to announce its fall schedule on May 16, 2010, followed by Fox on May 17, ABC on May 18, CBS on May 19 and The CW on May 20, 2010.

PBS is not included; member stations have local flexibility over most of their schedules and broadcast times for network shows may vary. The CW is not included on weekends, since it does not offer network programming. Beginning this season, MyNetworkTV is completely excluded; with the loss of WWE Friday Night SmackDown to Syfy, it has a schedule of all archived and rerun programming.

New series are highlighted in bold.

All times are U.S. Eastern Time and Pacific Time (except for some live sports or events). Subtract for one hour for Central and Mountain times.

Each of the 30 highest-rated shows is listed with its rank and rating as determined by Nielsen Media Research.

Legend

Sunday

Monday

Note: In February 2011, CBS and Warner Bros. stop producing Two and a Half Men for the rest of the season because of the firing of Charlie Sheen. So it aired reruns of the show.

Tuesday

Wednesday

Thursday

Friday

Saturday

By network

ABC

Returning series
20/20
ABC Saturday Movie of the Week
America's Funniest Home Videos
The Bachelor
Bachelor Pad
The Bachelorette
Brothers & Sisters
Castle
Cougar Town
Dancing with the Stars
Desperate Housewives
Extreme Makeover: Home Edition
Grey's Anatomy
Jamie Oliver's Food Revolution
The Middle
Modern Family
Primetime
Primetime: What Would You Do?
Private Practice
Rookie Blue
Saturday Night Football
Secret Millionaire (moved from Fox)
Shark Tank
Supernanny
V
Wipeout

New series
101 Ways to Leave a Game Show *
Better with You
Body of Proof *
Combat Hospital *
Detroit 1-8-7
Expedition Impossible *
Extreme Makeover: Weight Loss Edition *
Happy Endings *
Mr. Sunshine *
My Generation
No Ordinary Family
Off the Map *
Skating with the Stars
Take the Money and Run *
The Whole Truth

Not returning from 2009–10:
Better Off Ted
Dating in the Dark
The Deep End
Defying Gravity
Downfall
Eastwick
Find My Family
FlashForward
The Forgotten
The Gates
Hank
Happy Town
Lost
Romantically Challenged
Scoundrels
Scrubs
Shaq Vs.
True Beauty
Ugly Betty
Wife Swap

CBS

Returning series
48 Hours Mystery
60 Minutes
The Amazing Race
The Big Bang Theory
Criminal Minds
CSI: Crime Scene Investigation
CSI: Miami
CSI: NY
Flashpoint
The Good Wife
How I Met Your Mother
Medium
The Mentalist
NCIS
NCIS: Los Angeles
Rules of Engagement
Survivor
Two and a Half Men
Undercover Boss

New series
$#*! My Dad Says
Blue Bloods
CHAOS * 
Criminal Minds: Suspect Behavior *
The Defenders
Hawaii Five-0
Live to Dance *
Mad Love *
Mike & Molly
Same Name *

Not returning from 2009–10:
Accidentally on Purpose
Cold Case
Gary Unmarried
Ghost Whisperer
Miami Medical
The New Adventures of Old Christine
Numb3rs
Three Rivers

The CW

Returning series
90210
America's Next Top Model
Gossip Girl
Life Unexpected
One Tree Hill
Smallville
Supernatural
The Vampire Diaries

New series
Hellcats
Nikita
Shedding for the Wedding *

Not returning from 2009–10:
The Beautiful Life: TBL (Moved to YouTube)
Fly Girls
High Society
Hitched or Ditched
Melrose Place

Fox

Returning series
America's Most Wanted
American Dad!
American Idol
Bones
The Cleveland Show
COPS
Family Guy
Fringe
Glee
The Good Guys
Hell's Kitchen
House
Human Target
Kitchen Nightmares
Lie to Me
NFL on Fox
The OT
The Simpsons
So You Think You Can Dance

New series
Bob's Burgers *
Breaking In *
Buried Treasure
The Chicago Code *
Lone Star
Million Dollar Money Drop
Mobbed *
Raising Hope
Running Wilde
Traffic Light *

Not returning from 2009–10:
24 (returned as a limited series in 2013–14)
Brothers
Dollhouse
Past Life
Sons of Tucson
'Til Death

NBC

Returning series
30 Rock
America's Got Talent
The Apprentice
The Biggest Loser
Chuck
Community
Dateline NBC
Football Night in America
Law & Order: Special Victims Unit
The Marriage Ref
Minute to Win It
NHL on NBC
NBC Sunday Night Football
The Office
Parenthood
Parks and Recreation
Saturday Night Live
The Sing-Off
Who Do You Think You Are?

New series
America's Next Great Restaurant *
The Cape *
Chase
The Event
Friends with Benefits *
Harry's Law *
It's Worth What? *
Law & Order: LA
Love Bites *
Love in the Wild *
Outlaw
Outsourced
The Paul Reiser Show *
Perfect Couples *
School Pride
Undercovers
The Voice *

Not returning from 2009–10:
100 Questions
Heroes
The Jay Leno Show
Law & Order (returned for 2021–22)
Mercy
Trauma

Renewals and cancellations

Full season pickups

ABC
Better With You – On October 25, 2010, ABC ordered a full 22-episode season of the series.
Brothers & Sisters – On October 14, 2010, ABC ordered 4 additional scripts for the series. and then on October 25, 2010, ABC ordered a full 22-episode season.
Detroit 1-8-7 – Picked up for 5 additional episodes for an 18-episode season on October 25, 2010.
No Ordinary Family – On October 14, 2010, ABC ordered 4 additional scripts for the series, and then on October 25, 2010, ABC ordered a full 22-episode season.
Off the Map – On October 14, 2010, ABC ordered 1 additional script for the series. On October 26, 2010, they ordered an additional 5 scripts, bringing the series order to 7 episodes plus 6 scripts.

CBS
$#*! My Dad Says – On October 21, 2010, CBS ordered a 19-episode season of the series plus 3 additional scripts.
Blue Bloods – On October 21, 2010, CBS ordered a full 22-episode season of the series.
The Defenders – On October 21, 2010, CBS ordered a 19-episode season of the series plus 3 additional scripts.
Hawaii Five-0 – On October 21, 2010, CBS ordered a full 22-episode season of the series.
Mike & Molly – On October 21, 2010, CBS ordered a full 22-episode season of the series.

The CW
Hellcats – On September 23, 2010, The CW ordered 6 additional scripts for the series and then on October 22, 2010, The CW ordered a full 22-episode season of the series.
Nikita – On October 22, 2010, The CW Ordered a full 22-episode season of the series.
One Tree Hill – On September 23, 2010, The CW ordered 6 additional scripts for the series and then on October 22, 2010, The CW ordered a full 22-episode season of the series.

Fox
Human Target – On October 22, 2010, FOX ordered 2 additional scripts for the series.
Raising Hope – On October 6, 2010, the show was given a full 22-episode season, making it the first new show to ever get a full season order.

NBC
Chase – Picked up for a full 22-episode season on October 19, 2010, although this was later reduced to 18 episodes.
Chuck – Picked up for a 24-episode season October 19, 2010.
Community – On November 3, 2010, NBC ordered 2 additional episodes, bringing its current season to 24 episodes.
The Event – Picked up for a full 22-episode season on October 18, 2010.
Law & Order: LA – Picked up for a full 22-episode season on October 18, 2010.
Outsourced – Picked up for a full 22-episode season on October 18, 2010.

Renewals

ABC
20/20 – Announced on the fall schedule on May 17, 2011.
America's Funniest Home Videos – Announced on the fall schedule on May 17, 2011.
The Bachelor – Picked up for a sixteenth season on March 14, 2011.
The Bachelorette – Picked up for a seventh season on March 14, 2011.
Body of Proof – Picked up for a second season on May 13, 2011.
Castle – Picked up for a fourth season on January 10, 2011.
Cougar Town – Picked up for a third season on January 10, 2011.
Dancing with the Stars– Announced on the fall schedule for a thirteenth season on May 17, 2011.
Desperate Housewives– Announced on the fall schedule for an eighth season on May 17, 2011.
Extreme Makeover: Home Edition– Announced on the fall schedule for a ninth season on May 17, 2011.
Grey's Anatomy – Picked up for an eighth season on January 10, 2011.
Happy Endings – Picked up for a second season on May 13, 2011.
The Middle – Picked up for a third season on January 10, 2011.
Modern Family – Picked up for a third season on January 10, 2011.
Private Practice – Picked up for a fifth season on January 10, 2011.
Secret Millionaire – Picked up for a third season on May 13, 2011.
Shark Tank – Picked up for a third season on May 13, 2011.

CBS
48 Hours Mystery – Announced on the 2011/12 schedule for May 18, 2011.
60 Minutes – Announced on the 2011/12 schedule for on May 18, 2011.
The Amazing Race – Picked up for a nineteenth season on March 28, 2011.
The Big Bang Theory – Picked up for three additional seasons on January 12, 2011, running through its seventh season in 2013/14.
Blue Bloods – Picked up for a second season on May 15, 2011.
Criminal Minds – Announced on the 2011/12 schedule for a seventh season on May 18, 2011.
CSI: Crime Scene Investigation – Announced on the 2011/12 schedule for a twelfth season on May 18, 2011.
CSI: Miami – Announced on the 2011/12 schedule for a tenth season on May 18, 2011.
CSI: NY – Picked up for an eighth season on May 17, 2011.
The Good Wife – Announced on the 2011/12 schedule for a third season on May 18, 2011.
Hawaii Five-0 – Picked up for a second season on May 15, 2011.
 How I Met Your Mother – Picked up for two additional seasons on March 4, 2011, running through its eighth season in 2012/13.
The Mentalist – Announced on the 2011/12 schedule for a fourth season on May 18, 2011.
Mike & Molly – Picked up for a second season on May 15, 2011.
NCIS – Picked up for a ninth season on February 2, 2011.
NCIS: Los Angeles – Announced on the 2011/12 schedule for a third season on May 18, 2011.
Rules of Engagement – Picked up for a sixth season on May 17, 2011.
Survivor – Picked up for two additional seasons on March 9, 2011.
Two and a Half Men – Previously picked for an eighth and ninth season, but the show's eighth season was speculative after the firing of its star Charlie Sheen. However, CBS and Warner Bros. officially announced that Ashton Kutcher would join the cast as Sheen's replacement for the ninth season.
Undercover Boss – Picked up for a third season on March 28, 2011.

The CW
90210 – Picked up for a fourth season on April 26, 2011.
America's Next Top Model – Picked up for two more cycles in the 2011/12 season on April 26, 2011.
Gossip Girl – Picked up for a fifth season on April 26, 2011.
Nikita – Picked up for a second season on May 17, 2011.
One Tree Hill – Picked up for a ninth season on May 17, 2011.
Supernatural – Picked up for a seventh season on April 26, 2011.
The Vampire Diaries – Picked up for a third season on April 26, 2011.

Fox
America's Most Wanted - Scheduled to air as two-hour monthly specials for the 2011/12 TV season.
American Dad! – Picked up through the 2012/13 television season (seventh and eighth season) on February 23, 2011.
American Idol – Details for the season eleven auditions were announced on May 5, 2011.
Bob's Burgers – Picked up for a second season on April 7, 2011.
Breaking In – Revived by Fox on August 24, 2011.
Bones – Picked up for a seventh season on May 3, 2011.
The Cleveland Show – Picked up for a third season on June 10, 2010.
Family Guy – Picked up in 2008 through at least 2012.
Fringe – Picked up for a fourth season of 22 episodes on March 24, 2011.
Glee – Picked up for a third season on May 23, 2010.
House – Picked up for an eighth and final season on May 10, 2011.
Mobbed – Picked up for eight episodes on April 1, 2011, after a successful special debut.
Raising Hope – Picked up for a second season on January 11, 2011.
The Simpsons – Picked up for a twenty-third season on November 11, 2010.

NBC
30 Rock – Picked up for a sixth season on November 15, 2010.
The Biggest Loser – Picked up for a twelfth season on February 22, 2011.
Celebrity Apprentice – Announced as being on NBC's fall schedule on May 15, 2011.
Chuck – Picked up for a fifth and final season of 13 episodes on May 13, 2011.
Community – Picked up for a third season on March 17, 2011.
Harry's Law – Picked up for a second season on May 12, 2011.
Law & Order: Special Victims Unit – Announced as being on NBC's fall schedule for a 13th season on May 15, 2011.
The Office – Picked up for an eighth season on March 17, 2011.
Parenthood – Picked up for a third season on May 12, 2011.
Parks and Recreation – Picked up for a fourth season on March 17, 2011.
The Sing-Off – Picked up for a third season on February 22, 2011.
The Voice – Announced as being on NBC's fall schedule for a 2nd season on May 15, 2011.
Who Do You Think You Are? – Picked up for a third season on February 22, 2011.

Cancellations/Series endings

ABC
Better With You – Canceled on May 13, 2011.
Brothers & Sisters – Canceled on May 13, 2011, after five seasons.
Detroit 1-8-7 – Canceled on May 13, 2011.
Jamie Oliver's Food Revolution - Canceled on June 24, 2011, after two seasons.
Mr. Sunshine – Canceled on May 13, 2011.
My Generation – Canceled on October 1, 2010, after two episodes.
No Ordinary Family – Canceled on May 13, 2011.
Off the Map – Canceled on May 13, 2011.
Skating with the Stars – ABC announced the show will not have a second season.
Supernanny – Jo Frost announced on November 7, 2010, that she is leaving the show to start a family of her own, thus ending the series' run after seven seasons.
V – Canceled on May 13, 2011, after two seasons.
The Whole Truth – Canceled on October 25, 2010.

CBS
$#*! My Dad Says – Canceled on May 15, 2011.
CHAOS – Canceled on April 18, 2011, after three episodes.
Criminal Minds: Suspect Behavior – Canceled on May 17, 2011.
The Defenders – Canceled on May 15, 2011.
Flashpoint – CBS will pick up 7 of the 18 episodes from Season 4 to air with the 6 unaired Season 3 segments for a 13-episode run during the summer. Soon after that, ION is expected to begin airing all 51 episodes of the show that will have aired on CBS. Additionally, ION will premiere the remaining 11 episodes of Flashpoints fourth season.
Live to Dance – Due to dismal ratings, it was announced that the show will not return for a second season.
Mad Love – Canceled on May 15, 2011.
Medium – Canceled on November 18, 2010, after seven seasons. The series has been concluded on January 21, 2011.

The CW
Hellcats – Canceled on May 17, 2011.
Life Unexpected – The show's cancellation was confirmed when Warner Brothers chose to release both seasons of the show on DVD. The series ended on January 18, 2011.
Smallville – It was announced on March 4, 2010, that season ten would be the final season. The series has been concluded on May 13, 2011.

Fox
America's Most Wanted - Canceled on May 16, 2011.
The Chicago Code – Canceled on May 10, 2011.
The Good Guys – Fox announced the show will not have a second season.
Human Target – Canceled on May 10, 2011.
Lie to Me – Canceled on May 10, 2011, after three seasons.
Lone Star – Canceled on September 28, 2010, after airing only two episodes. This was the first cancellation of the season.
Million Dollar Money Drop – Canceled on August 5, 2011.
Running Wilde – The show was pulled from November sweeps, with the remaining episodes to air through December. On November 30, 2010 FOX announced that no new episodes would be ordered.
Traffic Light – Canceled on May 10, 2011.

NBC
America's Next Great Restaurant – Canceled on May 13, 2011.
The Cape – The show was officially canceled on March 2, 2011, due to low ratings. At that time, only 9 out of 10 episodes have aired as NBC announced the series finale would be aired on their website.
Chase – Officially placed on hiatus on February 3, 2011, and eventually canceled. The remaining five episodes were burned off on Saturdays through April 23, 2011.
The Event – Canceled on May 13, 2011.
Friday Night Lights – The fifth season premiered on April 15, 2011, after ending the series broadcast on DirecTV's owned The 101 Network. The series finale aired on July 8, 2011.
Law & Order: LA – Canceled on May 13, 2011.
Outlaw – Canceled on October 11, 2010.
Outsourced – Canceled on May 13, 2011.
The Paul Reiser Show – Canceled on April 22, 2011, after two episodes.
Perfect Couples – Canceled on May 13, 2011. It was placed on hiatus, then canceled and replaced by The Paul Reiser Show on April 14, 2011, with two episodes left to air.
School Pride – Canceled on May 13, 2011.
Undercovers – Canceled on November 4, 2010, after seven episodes.

See also
2010–11 United States network television schedule (daytime)
2010–11 United States network television schedule (late night)

Top weekly ratings 
 Data sources: AC Nielsen, TV By The Numbers

Total Viewers

18-49 Viewers

References

United States primetime network television schedules
2010 in American television
2011 in American television